Luigi Facta (16 November 1861 – 5 November 1930) was an Italian politician, lawyer and journalist and the last Prime Minister of Italy before the dictatorship of Benito Mussolini.

Background and earlier career

Facta was born in Pinerolo, Piedmont, Italy. He studied law and later became a lawyer and journalist. He entered politics in 1892 when he was elected to the chamber of deputies for Pinerolo, a seat which he held for 30 years. Facta, a member of the Liberal Party, served as undersecretary of the justice and interior departments in the coalition cabinet for much of his time in Parliament. He was also the Italian Minister of Finance from 1910 until 1914 and 1920 until 1921. At the outbreak of World War I, Facta supported neutrality for Italy, but then supported the war when Italy entered it. His son was killed in the war, and he said that he was proud to give a son to his country.

Prime Minister of Italy

Facta was appointed Prime Minister in February 1922. At the time, Italy was in political turmoil and was dealing with Mussolini's fascist insurgency. When Mussolini decided to march on Rome, Facta reacted and wanted to declare martial law and send the army to stop Mussolini. Such a declaration needed to bear the monarch's signature before it could take effect. Facta always refused to explain the secret reasons that brought King Victor Emmanuel III not to sign the declaration of emergency. The following day, Facta and his government resigned to demonstrate they did not approve of the King's decision. The King then requested that Mussolini come to Rome to form a new government.

Later life; death and legacy
 
In 1924, King Victor Emmanuel III named Facta senator in Italian Senate.

Facta died in Pinerolo, Italy, in 1930, with the general population believing him to have been too feeble and faithful to the King to take a more active role in stopping Mussolini and the rise of Fascism.

References

External links
 

1861 births
1930 deaths
People from Pinerolo
Italian Ministers of the Interior
Prime Ministers of Italy
Finance ministers of Italy
Italian journalists
Italian male journalists
Members of the Senate of the Kingdom of Italy